Summer Games is a sports video game developed and published by Epyx based on sports featured in the Summer Olympic Games. Released in 1984 for the Commodore 64, it was ported to the Apple II, Atari 2600, Atari 7800, Atari 8-bit family, and Sega Master System.

In the UK, the game was first released by Quicksilva and subsequently by U.S. Gold who later created versions for the Amiga, ZX Spectrum, Amstrad CPC and Atari ST for inclusion in compilations. In 2004 it was re-released on the C64 Direct-to-TV.

Summer Games was the first in Epyx's Games series which included: Summer Games II, Winter Games, World Games, California Games, California Games II, The Games: Summer Edition, and The Games: Winter Edition.

Gameplay

The game is presented as a virtual multi-sport competition called the "Epyx Games" (there was no official IOC licensing in place) with up to eight players each choosing a country to represent, and then taking turns competing in various events to try for a medal. A score of 5:3:1 is used — gold medals 5 points, silver medals 3 points, and bronze medals 1 point. On most versions, world records can be saved to the floppy disk.

The Commodore 64 version allows players to link Summer Games and Summer Games II to engage in one large Olympics, accumulating medals in a tournament from both games.

Events
The events available vary slightly depending on the platform, and include pole vault, platform diving, sprinting, gymnastics, freestyle swimming, and skeet shooting.

The game allows the player to compete in all of the events sequentially, choose a few events, choose just one event, or practice an event.

Reception
Epyx sold more than 250,000 copies of Summer Games by November 1989; Ahoy! described it as "tremendously successful". As the first of Epyx's "Games" series, it founded what a historian later described as "the most sustainedly popular in the long life of the Commodore 64", the most popular home computer of the mid-1980s.

In 1996, Next Generation listed the "Games" series collectively as number 89 on its "Top 100 Games of All Time". The magazine stated that though the games had great graphics for their time, their most defining qualities were their competitive multiplayer modes and "level of control that has yet to be equaled". In a retrospective review, Atari 7800 Forever gave only a 2.0 out of 5, criticizing the boring events.

See alsoOlympic Decathlon (1980)The Activision Decathlon (1983)Track & Field (1983)Daley Thompson's Decathlon'' (1984)

References

External links
Summer Games at MobyGames

Interview with Scott Nelson from The Epyx Shrine (by Cybergoth)
Images of Summer Games box, manual and screen shots

Review in GAMES Magazine

1984 video games
Epyx games
1984 Summer Olympics
Summer Olympic video games
Apple II games
Amiga games
Atari 2600 games
Atari 7800 games
Atari 8-bit family games
Atari ST games
Commodore 64 games
Master System games
U.S. Gold games
ZAP Corporation games
ZX Spectrum games
Video games developed in the United States
Multiplayer and single-player video games
Quicksilva games